Mullica Hill is a census-designated place (CDP) and unincorporated community within Harrison Township, Gloucester County, New Jersey. As of the 2020 United States census, the CDP's population was 4,698, an increase of 716 (+18.0%) from the 3,982 counted at the 2010 U.S. census, which in turn reflected an increase of 2,324 (+140.2%) from the 1,658 enumerated at the 2000 census.

History

Spicerville was the name of a community on the south bank of Raccoon Creek, named after prominent landowner Jacob Spicer. Mullica Hill originally referred to the settlement on the north bank of Raccoon Creek, named after the sons of Eric Pålsson Mullica, whose sons William, Eric, Olag, and John Mullica began purchasing land here in 1704. Eventually, both communities became known as just Mullica Hill as the original name of Eric's grandfather's house in Central Finland: "Mullikkamäki" (mullikka meaning bull calf and mäki meaning hill). Some of Mullica Hill's historic buildings were built following the Civil War, notably the town hall that still stands today. The period of industrial and agricultural growth during and after the Civil War is commemorated by a reenactment every fall. 

Geography
According to the United States Census Bureau, the CDP had a total area of 3.626 square miles (9.392 km2), including 3.603 square miles (9.333 km2) of land and 0.023 square miles (0.059 km2) of water (0.63%).

Demographics

Census 2010

Census 2000
As of the 2000 U.S. census there were 1,658 people, 697 households, and 432 families living in the CDP. The population density was 533.5/km2 (1,382.0/mi2). There were 737 housing units at an average density of 237.1/km2 (614.3/mi2). The racial makeup of the CDP was 91.07% White, 6.88% African American, 0.06% Native American, 0.72% Asian, 0.84% from other races, and 0.42% from two or more races. Hispanic or Latino of any race were 2.05% of the population.

There were 697 households, out of which 34.6% had children under the age of 18 living with them, 45.8% were married couples living together, 13.2% had a female householder with no husband present, and 37.9% were non-families. 33.9% of all households were made up of individuals, and 11.5% had someone living alone who was 65 years of age or older. The average household size was 2.37 and the average family size was 3.09.

The population was spread out, with 28.3% under the age of 18, 6.1% from 18 to 24, 33.7% from 25 to 44, 20.9% from 45 to 64, and 11.0% who were 65 years of age or older. The median age was 36 years. For every 100 females, there were 82.4 males. For every 100 females age 18 and over, there were 73.3 males.

The median income for a household in the CDP was $38,628, and the median income for a family was $62,321. Males had a median income of $48,295 versus $35,250 for females. The per capita income for the CDP was $22,503. About 6.4% of families and 8.1% of the population were below the poverty line, including 5.4% of those under age 18 and 20.7% of those age 65 or over.

Historic district

The Mullica Hill Historic District is a  national historic district along East Avenue, Woodstown Road, Church, High, Main, Mill, New and Union streets in the community. It was added to the National Register of Historic Places on April 25, 1991 for its significance in architecture, commerce, industry, community development, and exploration/settlement. The district includes 136 contributing buildings.

St. Stephen's Episcopal Church was built in 1852, with a bell tower added in 1879. It has been documented by the Historic American Buildings Survey.

Education
Mullica Hill hosts Harrison Township Elementary School which serves students in grades K - 3 and Pleasant Valley School (grades 4 - 6) as part of the Harrison Township School District. Public school students from Mullica Hill also attend Clearview Regional Middle School (grades 7 & 8), and Clearview Regional High School (grades 9-12) of the Clearview Regional High School District.  All are located in Mullica Hill. 

Friends School Mullica Hill is a private, nonsectarian, coeducational day school, serving students in pre-kindergarten through eighth grade, as well as giving private music lessons. The current school was originally established in 1969, but is part of a local Quaker tradition in the area extending back over 300 years.

Guardian Angels Regional School is a K-8 school that operates under the auspices of the Roman Catholic Diocese of Camden. Its PreK-3 campus is in Gibbstown while its 4-8 campus is in Paulsboro.

Transportation
New Jersey Transit bus service between Mullica Hill and Philadelphia is available on the 410 route.

New Jersey Route 45, New Jersey Route 77 and U.S. Route 322 are the main highways serving Mullica Hill. While Route 45 and Route 77 still pass through downtown, in January 2012 a new alignment of US 322 opened which bypasses the downtown area.

Notable people

People who were born in, residents of, or otherwise closely associated with Mullica Hill include:
 Jay Accorsi (born 1963), college football coach at Rowan University.
 John Brancy (born 1988), operatic baritone.
 Jeff Datz (born 1959), professional baseball scout and a former Major League Baseball player and coach.
 Wilbur Evans (1905-1987), actor and singer who performed on the radio, in opera, on Broadway, in films, and in early live television.
 Samuel Gibbs French (1818-1910), Confederate Major General during the Civil War.
George W. F. Gaunt (1865–1918), President of the New Jersey State Senate
 Big Daddy Graham (1953–2021), comedian, writer, actor, recording artist and sports radio personality on 94 WIP-FM.
 John W. Hazelton (1814-1878), represented New Jersey's 1st congressional district from 1871-1875.
 Dan Klecko, (born 1981) former NFL defensive tackle and fullback.
 Gregg Murphy, sports journalist who has been a broadcaster for the Philadelphia Phillies.
 Nathan T. Stratton (1813-1887), represented New Jersey's 1st congressional district in the United States House of Representatives from 1851 to 1855.
 Al Szolack (born 1950), retired basketball player best known for his time spent on the Washington Generals, the traveling exhibition team best known for their spectacular losing streak in exhibition games against the Harlem Globetrotters.
 Michelle Tumolo (born 1991), women's lacrosse coach and former player who is the Head Coach of the Army Black Knights women's lacrosse team.

References

External links

 Mullica Hill Weather and Climate Data

Census-designated places in Gloucester County, New Jersey
Harrison Township, New Jersey
Quaker meeting houses in New Jersey